Melady is a surname. Notable people with the surname include:

John Melady (born 1938), Canadian writer
Nicholas Melady (1845–1869), Canadian convicted murderer
Thomas Patrick Melady (1927–2014), American diplomat and author

See also
Melody (disambiguation)